The Recorder's Steps consist of two flights of stone steps leading down from the outside of the city walls in Chester, Cheshire, England.  They lead from the walkway at the top of the walls to a riverside area known as the Groves, and are recorded in the National Heritage List for England as a designated Grade I listed building.

The steps are in two flights, of 12 and 15 steps respectively.  They were constructed between 1820 and 1822 for Chester Corporation. On the wall by the steps is a plaque, probably inserted in 1881.  This contains erroneous information, being inscribed "RECORDER'S STEPS Erected by the Corporation of this City A.D.1700 for the Convenience of ROGER COMBERBACH, Recorder".

See also

Grade I listed buildings in Cheshire West and Chester

References

Buildings and structures in Chester
Grade I listed buildings in Chester
Steps